French Camp Vineyards is a vineyard in Paso Robles California, U.S.A. which is in the Paso Robles AVA.

History 
Originally, the French Camp land was part of the San Juan Ranch. Over time, The San Juan Ranch was split into a number of parcels including the French Camp area, which became a part of the Camatta Ranch.  The Miller family purchased The Camatta Ranch property in 1968, believing that it could be developed to various crops including wine grapes. They leased parts of it out for a few years while they gathered information as to climate, soils, and water for irrigation.  Initially,  were planted to wine grapes in 1973.  

The French Camp operation is a team effort among the people who have grown the grapes, those that have managed its business affairs, those that have sold the production (whether it was grapes or cuttings), and those that have done strategic planning for future growth.

Vineyard mechanization 

In cooperation with the University of Arkansas, Dr. Justin Morris (Director of Food Science & Engineering at U of A), and OXBO International, Hank Ashby, Vineyard Manager for French Camp Vineyards has adopted a new method for producing a better balanced and consistent crop.

The Morris-Oldridge canopy management system achieves yields within 10% of the yield goal. By using mechanization for pruning, shoot thinning, and fruit thinning, crop levels can be adjusted several times during the growing season. This practice would be cost prohibitive if not for mechanization.

In the average vineyard, annual yield can very as much as 50% year to year, making it very difficult to predict budgetary and wine productions numbers.

Moreover, in conjunction with Paso Robles Wine Services, French Camp has conducted trials demonstrating better quality fruit production as a result of the balanced cropping technique when compared against hand farmed fruit in many cases.

References

External links
 Interview with James Ontiveros, director of sales and marketing for (among others) French Camp Vineyard.
 
 
 
 French Camp Vineyards official web site
 

Wineries in San Luis Obispo County
Companies based in San Luis Obispo County, California
Paso Robles, California
American companies established in 1973
Agriculture companies established in 1973
Food and drink companies established in 1973
1973 establishments in California
Vineyards